The Emscher is a river, a tributary of the Rhine, that flows through the Ruhr area in North Rhine-Westphalia in western Germany.

Description

The Emscher has its wellspring in Holzwickede, east of the city of Dortmund. Towns along the Emscher are Dortmund, Castrop-Rauxel, Herne, Recklinghausen, Gelsenkirchen, Essen, Bottrop, Oberhausen and Dinslaken, where it flows into the Rhine.

At the centre of a vast industrial area with 5 million inhabitants the river is biologically dead, as it was used as an open waste-water canal from the end of the 19th century. The partial collapse of many coal mines along the Emscher's route made the option of subterranean sewer pipes running alongside unworkable, as they would break too easily.

Owing to the steady flow of spoil from the mining industry it has been impossible for the route of the Emscher to be maintained and its mouth into the Rhine has shifted north twice. A large wastewater treatment plant at its mouth treats the water of the Emscher before it flows into the Rhine.

Restoration

Since the early 1990s, efforts to restore the Emscher to its natural state have been making headway. The last coal mine was closed in December 2018. Now that coal mining near the route of the river has halted, a large underground pipe is being built along the path of the river. The first stretch of the river to be restored is that in the city of Dortmund. The overall project is headed by the public water board Emschergenossenschaft. The financial cost is estimated to be 4.5 billion Euro and the expected completion date for the main work is 2020.

The Emscher renaturation project, which is funded by a total of €1.3 billion in EU bank finance, protects and generates 1400 jobs per year.

References

External links

www.emschergenossenschaft.de

Rivers of North Rhine-Westphalia
 
Rivers of Germany